Paul Thomson (born: 10 April 1963 Iserlohn, West-Germany, Died: 1994 Toronto) is a sailor from Canada, who represented his country at the 1988 Summer Olympics in Busan, South Korea as helmsman in the Soling. With crew members Stuart Flinn and Philip Gow they took the 12th place. The same team competed in the 1992 Summer Olympics in Barcelona, Spain were they took the 7th place.

References

1963 births
1994 deaths
Sailors at the 1988 Summer Olympics – Soling
Sailors at the 1992 Summer Olympics – Soling
Olympic sailors of Canada
Canadian male sailors (sport)